The Toy Box is an American reality television show that debuted on April 7, 2017 on ABC. The show is about contestants as aspiring entrepreneurs, who present toy inventions first to a panel of toy industry professionals, then to a panel of child-judges. Only toys approved by the mentors are presented to the judges, "in the Toy Box," who select one toy to advance to the finals of each episode. The season's winning toy will be produced and distributed by Mattel and sold exclusively at Toys "R" Us stores.

On June 16, 2017, ABC renewed the series for a second season, which premiered on October 1, 2017, and ended on November 19, 2017. After Toys "R" Us announced that all UK and U.S. operations would be going out of business, the show was canceled without an official announcement.

Judges

Kids
In Season 1, a group of child-judges, up to the age of 13, play with the toys entered into the competition following the panel of toy industry experts. The children then vote on which toy was the best in each episode. In Season 2, the professional judging did not occur on camera. Season 1 had four child-judges that consistently appeared in each episode. Season 2 had ten child-judges, five of which were selected to judge for each episode. Only one child-judge from Season 1 (Noah Ritter) returned as a judge in Season 2.

Professionals

In Season 1, three professional judges and mentors (being esteemed toy reviewers and children's product creators) reviewed each product before it was sent to the child judges. This process happened off-screen and with different unknown professional judges in Season 2.

The professional judges in Season 1 were:

 Dylan Lauren
 Jim Silver
 Jen Tan

Production
The Toy Box was developed by Hudsun Media and Electus. ABC and Mattel Creation agreed that Hudsun would produce the show on their behalf. In October 2016, ABC picked up the show and Mattel greenlit the show for the 2016–17 Season. Eric Stonestreet was indicated at that time as being the host.

Episodes

Season 1 (2017)
"YES" and "NO" indicate the adult panel results; "FINALIST" designates the toy chosen by the child jury to advance to the finals.

Season 2 (2017)
"YES" and "NO" indicate the child panel results (getting at least three "Yes" votes from the five child judges); "FINALIST" designates the toy chosen by the child jury to advance to the finals.

List of toys featured at Toys "R" Us

Other than the guaranteed Mattel contract for the winner, other non-winning toys are also featured at Toys "R" Us. Occasionally, the toy's branding changes before being distributed.

Season 1
 "Artsplash™ 3D Liquid Art" – appeared on "Episode 7" and "Episode 8" as "3D Liquid Art"
 "Sweet Shaper™" – appeared on "Episode 6" and "Episode 8" as "Candy Krusher"
 "Noisy Persons™ Card Game" – appeared on "Episode 7" as "Noisy Person Cards"

Season 2
 "Hydroshield™ Water Dodger" – appeared on "Episode 1" and "Episode 8" as "Water Dodger"
 "Eardorables™" appeared on "Episode 6"
 "Wobb-Ball™" appeared on "Episode 4" as "Flexxball"

List of all toys presented

Season 1

Season 2

See also
Shark Tank
American Inventor

References

External links

The Toy Box at Rotten Tomatoes

American Broadcasting Company original programming
2017 American television series debuts
2017 American television series endings
2010s American reality television series
English-language television shows
Television series by Mattel Creations
Toys "R" Us